Boogity Boogity was Ray Stevens' eleventh studio album, released in 1974, as well as his sixth for Barnaby Records. For this album, Stevens returns to the genres of novelty and comedy. The album was released to capitalize on the success of his hit single "The Streak", which was inspired by the fad of streaking during that time period. Stevens' two songs, "Freddie Feelgood (And His Funky Little Five Piece Band)" and "Bagpipes That's My Bag," were taken from his album Gitarzan and were reissued on this album. The front of the album cover shows Stevens running in a blur, seemingly in the nude, and also contains the phrases "Woosh!!" and "Don't look Ethel!" the latter of which is part of the lyrics to the primary single of the album.

"The Streak" proved to be an even bigger success than Stevens' 1970 hit "Everything Is Beautiful," reaching #1 in the US, Canada, UK, and New Zealand. Its follow-up single, "The Moonlight Special," was lifted from this album but did not fare as well on the charts. Stevens' 1971 single, "Bridget the Midget (The Queen of the Blues)," first appeared on a collection called Ray Stevens' Greatest Hits but was reissued on this album, making its first appearance on a studio album.

Janus Records released a version of the album (#6310 301) with the same artwork but with an extended track listing. Both Barnaby Records and Janus Records were issued by the GRT (General Recorded Tape) Group.

On May 17, 2005, this album and Stevens' album Nashville were re-released together on one CD.

Track listing (Barnaby Records)

Track listing (Janus Records)

Album credits
All songs published by: Ahab Music Co., Inc. (BMI)
Arranged and Produced by: Ray Stevens for Ahab Productions, Inc. and GRT Corp.
Engineer: Tom Knox
Art direction: Neil Terk
Cover photo: John Donegan
Cover art: Kristin Mull
Vocals, Siren whistle: Ray Stevens

Charts

Weekly charts

Singles - Billboard (North America)

References

1974 albums
Ray Stevens albums
Barnaby Records albums